Rohan Bopanna and Aisam-ul-Haq Qureshi won in the doubles' final of the first edition of these championships. They defeated Thais: Sanchai Ratiwatana and Sonchat Ratiwatana in three sets (6–3, 6–7(5), [10–5]).

Seeds

Draw

Draw

External links
 Main Draw

Doubles
SAT Khorat Open - Doubles
 in Thai tennis